Ateline alphaherpesvirus 1 (AtHV-1) is a species of virus in the genus Simplexvirus, subfamily Alphaherpesvirinae, family Herpesviridae, and order Herpesvirales.

References 

Alphaherpesvirinae